Ivan Donald Margary,   (1896–1976) was a British historian who, during his lifetime, became the leading authority on Roman roads in Great Britain. He wrote numerous works on Roman roads of which his most influential and complete was Roman Roads In Britain.

He was educated privately and then matriculated into Exeter College, Oxford in 1913 to study chemistry. From 1914 to 1919, he served in the Royal Sussex Regiment of the British Army during the First World War. Having been a member of the Officers Training Corps, he was commissioned as a second lieutenant on 8 April 1915. He was injured multiple times, including a broken ankle and being shot in the back and neck. He returned to Oxford after the war and graduated with a Bachelor of Arts (BA) degree in 1921.

Margary's primary gift to the study of Roman roads was the development of a catalogue system known as Margary numbers, numbering Roman roads so that they could be referred to by catalogue number to avoid confusion, and to allow cross-referencing of the same road between different studies and authors.

In later life, he financed the excavation of Fishbourne Roman Palace, near Chichester in West Sussex, and the building of Margary Quad at Exeter, his old college. He contributed to the National Trust's excavation at Avebury Stone Circle and to the archaeology department of the British School at Rome. His other interests included meteorology and agriculture.

Honours and awards
In 1932, Margary was elected Fellow of the Society of Antiquaries of London. He declined all other nominations for recognition.

Selected works 
 Roman Roads in Britain, Phoenix House, London. Vol. 1 (South, 1955) and Vol.2 (North, 1957)

References

1896 births
1976 deaths
Historians of ancient Rome
20th-century British historians
Historians of Roman Britain
Alumni of Exeter College, Oxford
Royal Sussex Regiment officers